Dil To Pagal Hai, is a 1997 Indian Hindi-language musical romance film directed by Yash Chopra. The film follows the love lives of the members of a musical troupe, in which two dancers played by Madhuri Dixit and Karisma Kapoor get entangled in a love triangle with their choreographer played by Shah Rukh Khan, with Akshay Kumar as the childhood friend of Dixit's character. The film marked Khan's second film with Chopra after Darr (1993), and the third film to feature Khan opposite Dixit, after Anjaam (1994) and Koyla (1997), and Kapoor for the first time. This is also the only film to star Khan and Kumar, and Dixit and Kapoor. The soundtrack was composed by Uttam Singh, while the lyrics were penned by Anand Bakshi. 

The film received widespread critical acclaim, with praise for its direction, story, screenplay, soundtrack, cinematography and performances of Khan, Dixit, Kapoor and Kumar. 

Dil To Pagal Hai is the recipient of several awards. At the 45th National Film Awards, the film won 3 awards, including Best Popular Film Providing Wholesome Entertainment. Additionally, it received 11 nominations at the 43rd Filmfare Awards, including Best Director (Yash) and Best Supporting Actor (Kumar), and won 8 awards, including Best Film, Best Actor (Khan), Best Actress (Dixit), and Best Supporting Actress (Kapoor).

The film was screened retrospective, during the 2014 International Film Festival of India in the Celebrating Dance in Indian cinema section.

Plot 
Rahul and Nisha are members of a massive dance troupe that performs dance-based musical plays. Nisha is secretly in love with Rahul, but outwardly, they are just the best of friends. Rahul announces his desire to direct a new musical named Maya. The members of the troupe, including Nisha, have their doubts about the title character, "Maya," who Rahul describes as a girl who believes in true love, waiting for her prince charming, who will surely turn up and take her away. Nisha is selected to play the role of this girl, Maya.

The troupe welcomes a new entrant, Pooja, who is an amazing dancer, classically trained as well, and passionate about dancing. Having been orphaned at a young age, Pooja has been raised by close friends of her parents. Pooja and Rahul have a string of near-misses as they run into each other time and again. Each of these instances is marked by a tune playing in the background, that registers with Pooja. Doted upon by her foster family, Pooja is soon taken to Germany by her guardian's son Ajay, her childhood best friend who has been in London for months. Just as Ajay leaves to fly to London, he proposes to Pooja. In a dilemma, Pooja ends up accepting the offer of marriage. 

Meanwhile, Nisha injures her leg During rehearsals for the upcoming play, and the doctor says she should not dance for a few months. Rahul needs a new woman to play the lead role in the play. He comes across Pooja dancing one day, and believes she is perfect for the role. He begs her to come to their rehearsals and she agrees. Rahul and Pooja become close friends. Nisha soon returns from the hospital and is upset that she has been replaced. Upon learning that Rahul loves Pooja, she becomes very jealous of Pooja. Knowing that Rahul does not reciprocate her love, she decides to leave for London. Throughout rehearsals, Rahul and Pooja find themselves falling for one another. When Rahul drops Pooja home one day, he starts whistling his tune, making Pooja realize that she has fallen for the man with the tune she so often heard. The next day, the two go to meet Pooja's old dance tutor, who Pooja addresses as Tayi, who figures that the two are ardently in love. At the wedding of two members of the dance troupe, Rahul and Pooja share an intimate moment, but are unsure how to express their love for each other.

A few days before the premiere, Ajay arrives at the rehearsal hall to surprise Pooja. He tells everyone that he is her fiancé. Rahul is heartbroken, but tries not to show it. Nisha, who has returned, notices Rahul's devastation and explains how she too was devastated when he did not love her in return. Rahul edits the end of the play to reflect his heartbreak, in contrast to his usual style of always giving a happy ending. On the night of the premiere, as Rahul and Pooja's characters are about to break up on stage, Ajay plays a recorded tape Pooja was going to send him before his proposal, where she described how she felt about Rahul. Ajay is indirectly telling Pooja that she and Rahul are meant to be together. Pooja now realizes she truly loves Rahul and the two confess their love on stage as the audience applauds them, giving the play a happy ending once again. Also, backstage, Ajay ends up asking Nisha whether she is already married or not (implying him getting interested in her).

Cast 
Shahrukh Khan as Rahul
Madhuri Dixit as Pooja
Karisma Kapoor as Nisha
Akshay Kumar as Ajay
Farida Jalal as Ajay's mother
Deven Verma as Ajay's father
Aruna Irani as Pooja's Tai
Suresh Menon as Supandi: Rahul and Nisha's friend
Rajesh Tandon as Raju: Rahul and Nisha's friend
Shruti Ulfat as Shruti: Rahul and Nisha's friend
Balvinder Singh Suri as Ballu: Rahul and Nisha's friend and Soni's brother
Murad Ali as Jimmy: Rahul and Nisha's friend and Soni's husband
Priya Varma as Soni: Rahul and Nisha's friend; Ballu's sister; and Jimmy's wife
Tanya Mukherjee as Tania: Rahul and Nisha's friend
Shivani Wazir as Anjali: Pooja's friend

Production 

Dil To Pagal Hai was the second of Chopra's 4 consecutive films to star Shah Rukh Khan in the lead role. It was the third film to feature Shah Rukh Khan opposite Madhuri Dixit, after Anjaam (1994) and Koyla (1997). The film was originally titled Maine To Mohabbat Kar Li and Tevar before Yash Chopra finally settled on Dil To Pagal Hai as the title.

Sridevi was initially offered to play the part of Pooja, but she refused it. The role then went to Dixit. After casting Dixit in the lead role of Pooja, Chopra found it hard to cast the role of Nisha, which was eventually essayed by Kapoor. The role had been earlier offered to Manisha Koirala, who refused the role. Chopra then offered it to Juhi Chawla, as Chopra wanted the 2 leading actresses of that time to appear together on screen. But Chawla did not want to play second-fiddle to Dixit, especially after playing the leading-lady in Chopra's Darr (1993). Kajol and Raveena Tandon were next offered the role; however, Kajol deemed the role insubstantial, while Raveena Tandon was considering quitting her career at the time. The role was also offered to Urmila Matondkar who accepted, but left the film after a day of shooting. No leading-lady of that time was willing to take the risk of playing the second lead to Dixit. Chopra finally approached Kapoor with the film and she agreed to take up the challenge and was finally signed for the role. She felt that despite the short screen-time, a lot could be achieved with her role.

In addition to writing the story, Chopra co-produced the film along with M. Vakil under the banner Yash Raj Films. The script was written by Chopra, his son Aditya and wife Pamela. The film's costumes were handled together by Manish Malhotra, Karan Johar and Salman. Manmohan Singh was the cinematographer. The choreography was handled by Farah Khan and Shiamak Davar. This was one of Shahid Kapoor's first appearances on film. He was a background dancer in the song "Le Gayi".

Chopra rejected 54 dresses created by Manish Malhotra for Dixit's character, choosing a salwar kameez over others. Filming began in June 1996. It was the first Bollywood film to be shot in Baden-Baden and Europa Park, both German tourist attractions. It was made on a budget of 90 million.

Soundtrack 

The soundtrack of Dil To Pagal Hai includes 10 songs. The songs for the film were composed by Uttam Singh. Lyrics were written by Anand Bakshi. The music was a major hit among the audience, with the album becoming the best-selling Bollywood soundtrack of the year, with 12.5million soundtrack album sales. In 2008, Chopra launched an unreleased song from the Dil To Pagal Hai soundtrack, titled "Chanda Ki Chandni (Kitni Hai Bekarar Yeh)" sung by Lata Mangeshkar & Kumar Sanu.

Release 
Approximately 300 prints of the film were released worldwide, with 250–260 across India, including approximately 60 in the Mumbai circuit. 60 prints were released overseas.

Box office 
Screen reported that Dil To Pagal Hai opened to a "record business with 100 percent collections in the first week all over India." The report added that prints were sold as 2 crore per territory. 100 per cent collections were report also in the second week, and 97 per cent in the third.

It opened on Friday, 31 October 1997, across 245 screens, and earned  nett on its opening day. It became the third highest opener of the year behind Border ( nett) and Koyla ( nett). It grossed  nett in its opening weekend, and had a first week of  nett. The film earned a total of  nett. It is the 2nd-highest-grossing film of 1997 in India after Border which grossed  nett.

It earned $3.3 million (12.04 crore) outside India. Overseas, It is the highest-grossing film of 1997. Dil To Pagal Hai is the highest-grossing Indian film of 1997 worldwide.

Critical reception 
Omar Ahmed of Empire gave the film 4 out of 5 stars, noting, "It's great eye-candy, painting a portrait of a newly prosperous India in rainbow colours. Good performances too make this a cut above the Bollywood average."  

Yahoo! Movies, Rediff.com, IBNLive and The Times of India have listed Dil To Pagal Hai as one of the top 10 Yash Chopra films.

See also 
 List of accolades received by Dil To Pagal Hai

Notes

References

External links 
 

1990s Hindi-language films
1990s dance films
1997 romantic comedy-drama films
1997 films
Indian romantic comedy-drama films
Films directed by Yash Chopra
Films scored by Uttam Singh
Indian dance films
Films featuring a Best Supporting Actress National Film Award-winning performance
Yash Raj Films films
Best Popular Film Providing Wholesome Entertainment National Film Award winners
Films featuring a Best Choreography National Film Award-winning choreography
1997 comedy films
1997 drama films